Joe Mantello is an American actor and director of projects on the stage and screen. 

Mantello made his acting debut on Broadway in Tony Kushner's Angels in America: Millennium Approaches (1993) and Angels in America: Peristroika (1994) for which he earned a Tony Award for Best Featured Actor in a Play nomination. He also acted in the revival of Larry Kramer's The Normal Heart in 2011 and Tennessee Williams's The Glass Menagerie in 2017. He  is also known for directing both comedic and dramatic plays and musicals on the Broadway stage including Wicked (2003), Glengarry Glenn Ross (2005), 9 to 5 (2009), The Humans (2016), Three Tall Women and The Boys in the Band (both 2018). He has received eight Tony Award nominations winning twice for Best Direction of a Play for Take Me Out in 2003 and Best Direction of a Musical for Assassins in 2005. For his work in theatre he also received two Drama Desk Awards, a Drama League Award and two Outer Critics Circle Awards. 

For his acting work in television he earned Primetime Emmy Award and Critics' Choice Television Award nominations for his performance as Mickey Marcus in the HBO television film The Normal Heart (2014). He also appeared in Ryan Murphy's limited series Hollywood (2020). That same year he directed the Netflix film Boys in the Band (2020).

Major associations

Tony Awards

Emmy Awards

Theatre awards

Drama Desk Awards

Drama League Awards

Outer Critics Circle Awards

References 

Mantello, Joe